Arun Kumar (born 26 June 1964) is an Indian politician, who currently serves as Member of Legislative Assembly from Nagrota constituency. Arun Kumar won first time from Nagrota constituency in 2017 state assembly elections.

Early life and education
Arun Kumar was born on 26 June 1964 in Nagrota, Kangra district, Himachal Pradesh to Atma Ram and Bimla Devi.

Arun Kumar had Diploma in Electronics.

Politics
Arun Kumar active politics started from 2001. He became Member of Municipal Council Nagrota Bagwan from January 2001 to January, 2017, four times in the period. Also He was Vice President of Municipal Council Nagrota Bagwan from 19th January, 2006 to 2010 & 1st February, 2011 to November, 2016. He became BJP State Executive in 2015.

He Fought Himachal Pradesh Legislative Assembly Election in 2012 as an Independent candidate and lost with margin of 1137 votes.

Then in 2017, he was elected to the thirteenth Himachal Pradesh Legislative Assembly in December, 2017.

References

Bharatiya Janata Party politicians from Himachal Pradesh
1964 births
Living people
Himachal Pradesh MLAs 2017–2022